The Grecian Daughter is a 1772 tragedy by the Irish writer Arthur Murphy.

The original Drury Lane cast included Spranger Barry as Evander, Ann Street Barry as Euphrasia, John Palmer as Dionysius, Samuel Reddish as Philotus, Joseph Inchbald as Callipus, Francis Aickin as Melathon, James Aickin as Phocion, John Hayman Packer as Greek Herald and Richard Hurst as Arcas.

It was revived on a number of occasions over subsequent decades.

References

Bibliography
 Nicoll, Allardyce. A History of English Drama 1660–1900: Volume III. Cambridge University Press, 2009.
 Hogan, C.B (ed.) The London Stage, 1660–1800: Volume V. Southern Illinois University Press, 1968.

1772 plays
Tragedy plays
West End plays
Plays by Arthur Murphy